STS-94 was a mission of the United States Space Shuttle Columbia, launched on 1 July 1997.

Crew

Mission highlights

This was a reflight of the STS-83 Microgravity Science Laboratory (MSL) mission. MSL was originally launched on 4 April 1997 at 2:20 pm EST and was intended to be on orbit for 15 days, 16 hours. The mission was cut short due to a problem with Fuel Cell #2 and Columbia landed on 8 April 1997 after 3 days 23 hours.

The primary payload on STS-83 was the Microgravity Science Laboratory (MSL). MSL was a collection of microgravity experiments housed inside a European Spacelab Long Module (LM). It built on the cooperative and scientific foundation of the International Microgravity Laboratory missions (IML-1 on STS-42 and IML-2 on STS-65), the United States Microgravity Laboratory missions (USML-1 on STS-50 and USML-2 on STS-73), the Japanese Spacelab mission (Spacelab-J on STS-47), the Spacelab Life and Microgravity Science Mission (LMS on STS-78) and the German Spacelab missions (D-1 on STS-61-A and D-2 on STS-55).

MSL featured 19 materials science investigations in 4 major facilities. These facilities were the Large Isothermal Furnace, the EXpedite the PRocessing of Experiments to the Space Station (EXPRESS) Rack, the Electromagnetic Containerless Processing Facility (TEMPUS) and the Coarsening in Solid-Liquid Mixtures (CSLM) facility, the Droplet Combustion Experiment (DCE) and the Combustion Module-1 Facility. Additional technology experiments were to be performed in the Middeck Glovebox (MGBX) developed by the Marshall Space Flight Center (MSFC) and the High-Packed Digital Television (HI-PAC DTV) system was used to provide multi-channel real-time analog science video.

The Large Isothermal Furnace was developed by the Japanese Space Agency (NASDA) for the STS-47 Spacelab-J mission and was also flown on STS-65 IML-2 mission. It housed the Measurement of Diffusion Coefficient by Shear Cell Method Experiment, the Diffusion of Liquid Metals and Alloys Experiment, the Diffusion in Liquid Led-Tin-Telluride Experiment, the Impurity Diffusion in Ionic Melts Experiment, the Liquid Phase Sintering II Experiment (LIF), and the Diffusion Processes in Molten Semiconductors Experiment (DPIMS).

The Combustion Module-1 (CM-1) facility from the NASA Lewis Research Center housed experiments on Laminar Soot Processes Experiment and the Structure of Flame Balls at Low Lewis-number Experiment (SOFBALL).

The DCE apparatus is integrated into a single width MSL Spacelab rack in the cargo bay.

The EXPRESS rack replaces a Spacelab Double rack and special hardware will provide the same structural and resource connections the rack will have on the Space Station. It will house the Physics of Hard Spheres (PHaSE) experiment and the Astro/PGBA Experiment.

The Electromagnetic Containerless Processing Facility (TEMPUS) is used for the Experiments on Nucleation in Different Flow Regimes, Thermophysical Properties of Advanced Materials in the Undercooled Liquid State Experiment, Measurements of the Surface Tension of Liquid and Undercooled Metallic Alloys by Oscillating Drop Technique Experiment, Alloy Undercooling Experiments, the Study of the Morphological Stability of Growing Dendrites by Comparative Dendrite Velocity Measurements on Pure Ni and Dilute Ni–C Alloy in the Earth and Space Laboratory Experiment, the Undercooled Melts of Alloys with Polytetrahedral Short-Range Order Experiment, the Thermal Expansion of Glass Forming Metallic Alloys in the Undercooled State Experiment, the AC Calorimetry and Thermophysical Properties of Bulk Glass-Forming Metallic Liquids experiment and the Measurement of Surface Tension and Viscosity of Undercooled Liquid Metals experiment.

There were also experiments on measuring microgravity. They included the Space Acceleration Measurement System (SAMS), the Microgravity Measurement Assembly (MMA), the Quasi-Steady Acceleration Measurement System and the Orbital Acceleration Research Experiment (OARE).

The Middeck Glovebox (MGBX) facility supported the Bubble and Drop Nonlinear Dynamics (BDND) Experiment, the Study of the Fundamental Operation of a Capillary-driven Heat Transfer (CHT) Device in Microgravity Experiment, the Internal Flows in a Free Drop (IFFD) experiment and the Fiber Supported Droplet Combustion experiment (FSDC-2).

See also

List of human spaceflights
List of Space Shuttle missions
Outline of space science

External links

 NASA mission summary
 STS-94 Video Highlights 

Spacecraft launched in 1997
Space Shuttle missions